Nestlé Munch is a chocolate bar made by Nestlé and primarily sold in India. It is a long chocolate bar filled with wafers.

Variants
Munch's variants are Munch Nuts, which includes groundnuts with wafers and Munch Crunch O'Nuts, which includes peanuts.

References

External links
 Official website 1
 Official website 2
 Munch Nuts official website

Chocolate bars
Nestlé brands